Aladikme is a village in the Baskil District of Elazığ Province in Turkey. The village is populated by Kurds of the Parçikan tribe and had a population of 210 in 2021. The hamlets of Aydoğan, Caddealtı, Cansızkayış, Çuğraş, Döşeli, Konacık, Kömürhan, Selvi and Ünsaldı are attached to the village.

Aladikme has a primary and a middle school. A forest fire broke out near the village on 9 August 2019, which was extinguished before 20 August.

References

Villages in Baskil District
Kurdish settlements in Elazığ Province